Manpa may refer to:

MANPA -Venezuelan pulp company
Manpa, Homalin - Sagaing Region, Burma